Keadby Power Stations are a pair of natural gas-fired power stations near Scunthorpe in North Lincolnshire, built on the site of a older coal power station. The site lies near the B1392 and the River Trent, and the Scunthorpe-Grimsby railway. Also nearby is the Stainforth and Keadby Canal, which is part of the Sheffield and South Yorkshire Navigation. The current stations are operated by SSE Thermal.

SSE also owns a 68 MWe capacity wind farm, Keadby Wind Farm, nearby. This was England's largest onshore wind farm, and started operating in July 2014.

Keadby Gas Power Station
Keadby Gas Power Station was commissioned on 22 January 1996, and was opened by Scottish Hydro Electric and NORWEB when the site was in South Humberside. Scottish Hydro bought the 50% share of Keadby Generation Ltd, then owned by United Utilities, in March 1997 for £253 million. It is now owned by Scottish and Southern Energy.

In March 2013 the power station was 'deep mothballed' in response to adverse market conditions; it reopened in December 2015 after winning a stand-by contract to provide 734 MWe of capacity.

It is a CCGT type power station running on natural gas. There are two General Electric Frame 9FA gas turbines each rated at 250 MWe. The total thermal input is 1329 MW. Each gas turbine is connected to a heat recovery steam generator which connect to one steam turbine which has an output of 260 MWe. Steam is condensed using water from the River Trent. There is a 25 MWe 11 kV gas turbine available for black starts when there is no power to start producing electricity. The station connects to the National Grid at 400 kV, being used for baseload.

Keadby 2

In 1999, Scottish Hydro applied to add another 710 MWe of capacity at Keadby, and a variation to this consent was granted in November 2016. The project, called 'Keadby 2', was announced in May 2018.

Construction on the plant, now rated at 893 MWe, began in August 2018. The station was planned to come online in October 2022, but this date was missed, with the plant coming online in February 2023.

Keadby Three
In December 2022, development consent was obtained for a third plant on the Keadby site. Keadby Three is planned to be a 910 MWe plant with carbon capture and storage, with opening planned as soon as 2027.

Keadby coal-fired station
The first power station on the site was authorised in 1947 and work on the foundations began in July 1948. It was designed to have a total capacity of 360 MW.

The plant comprised six Stirling radiant type, pulverised fuel, twin furnace boilers. Each boiler had an evaporation capacity of 550,000 lb/hr (69.3 kg/s) of steam, the total evaporative capacity of the completed station was 3,300,000 lb/hr (415.8 kg/s). Steam conditions were 925 psi and 915 °F (63.8  bar and 490.6 °C).

There were six Parsons 60 MW hydrogen cooled turbo-alternators, generating at 11 kV. The first set was commissioned in April 1952, followed by the other sets in November 1952, June 1953, June 1954, December 1954 and December 1955. In 1952 the boiler associated with the first set was the largest yet commissioned in the UK.

The generating capacity and electricity output from Keadby power station is given in the following table.

The coal-fired station closed in 1984.

See also

 Keadby Generation Ltd - the company owned by Scottish & Southern Energy that also ran Fiddlers Ferry power station.

References

External links

Natural gas-fired power stations in England
Power stations in Lincolnshire
Power stations in Yorkshire and the Humber